Knut Andersen can refer to:

 Knut Andersen (film director) (1931–2019), Norwegian film director
 Knut Andersen (footballer, born 1908) (1908–1981), Norwegian footballer
 Knut Andersen (footballer, born 1927) (born 1927), Norwegian footballer
 Knut Andersen (footballer, born 1930) (1930–2002), Norwegian footballer